L'Jarius Sneed (born January 21, 1997) is an American football cornerback for the Kansas City Chiefs of the National Football League (NFL). He played college football at Louisiana Tech. He was drafted by the Chiefs in the fourth-round (138th overall) of the 2020 NFL Draft.

Early years
After playing wide receiver for Minden High School, Sneed committed to Louisiana Tech on February 3, 2016.

College career
Sneed converted to cornerback at Louisiana Tech and saw playing time in his true freshman season, highlighted by an interception return touchdown against Western Kentucky in the Conference USA Championship Game. He started about half the games at corner during his sophomore season before moving into a permanent starting role his junior season. He moved to free safety before his senior season, and was named second-team all-C-USA after the season. Sneed also participated in the 2020 NFLPA Collegiate Bowl.

Professional career

Sneed was selected by the Kansas City Chiefs in the fourth round with the 138th overall pick in the 2020 NFL Draft. The Chiefs moved him back to cornerback during his rookie training camp.

In Sneed's professional debut against the Houston Texans in Week 1, he recorded his first career interception in the 34–20 victory. After breaking his collarbone in the Chiefs week 3 game against the Baltimore Ravens, Sneed was placed on injured reserve on September 30. He was activated on November 21, 2020.
In Week 15 against the New Orleans Saints, he recorded his first career sack during the 32–29 win.

In the Chiefs 22–17 victory in the Divisional Round of the playoffs against the Cleveland Browns, Sneed recorded a sack.
In the AFC Championship against the Buffalo Bills, Sneed recorded one sack in the Chiefs 38–24 victory.

In 2022, Sneed won his first Super Bowl when the Chiefs defeated the Philadelphia Eagles 38-35 with Snead recording 7 tackles and 2 passes defende in the win.

References

External links
Kansas City Chiefs bio
Louisiana Tech Bulldogs bio

1997 births
Living people
People from Minden, Louisiana
Players of American football from Louisiana
American football cornerbacks
American football safeties
Louisiana Tech Bulldogs football players
Kansas City Chiefs players